Guilherme de Abreu Sampaio Samaia (born 2 October 1996 in São Paulo) is a retired Brazilian racing driver. He has competed in the 2021 Formula 2 Championship with Charouz, and in 2020 racing for Campos. In 2017 he won the Brazilian Formula 3 season with Cesário F3.

Career

Karting
Samaia began his racing career in karting in 2012, competing the Florida Winter Tour - Rotax Junior championship. His only season in the championship resulted in Samaia finishing 47th out of 63 competitors. The championship was won by Oliver Askew and had Kyle Kirkwood and Juan Manuel Correa also competing.

Junior Formulas in Brazil
In 2013, Samaia competed in 2 of the 16 races in the Fórmula Junior Brazil championship for Satti Racing Team, gaining 10 points and finishing 16th.

For 2015, he switched to the Formula 3 Brazil Light series racing for Cesário. He scored thirteen podiums in sixteen races, including six wins and took the championship title with 171 points, thirty points ahead of 2nd place Matheus Muniz.

Sticking with Cesário, Samaia jumped up to Formula 3 Brazil for the 2016 season. He finished 2nd in the first round of the season at Velopark, behind Carlos Cunha Filho. Samaia didn't win his first race until the 1st race at the Autódromo José Carlos Pace Circuit in the forth round of the season, he would go on to win two more races meaning he finished the season with three wins and ten podiums. Samaia finished 2nd with 140 points, sixty-five points behind eventual champion Matheus Iorio.

In 2017 Samaia dominated the Formula 3 A Brasil championship, winning all but three of the sixteen races finishing fifth, eighth and second respectively in the races that he did not win. This ultimately led to him winning the championship by 87 points.

BRDC British Formula 3
In 2017, Samaia competed in the British F3 championship with Double R Racing. Samaia finished the season 13th with two podiums at Spa-Francorchamps and Snetterton. He finished behind current Williams F1 development driver and 2019 W Series champion Jamie Chadwick along with the 20 year old season champion Enaam Ahmed.

Euroformula Open
Samaia made his début in the Euroformula Open Championship in 2017 with Carlin at the fifth round in Silverstone where he finished 14th. Samaia would continue to race for the remaining races where he would finish the season in seventeenth with seven points behind fellow Brazilian Christian Hahn.

In 2018 Samaia made the switch to the Italian team RP Motorsport. His highest finish was his only podium when he finished third at the first race of the third round in Belgium. He ended the season 6th with 94 points. Teammate, fellow compatriot and 2020 Formula 2 competitor Felipe Drugovich won the championship with 405 points.

For 2019, Samaia switched to Spanish outfit Teo Martín Motorsport where he would race in the first four rounds. He achieved one podium at Le Castellet in the second race of the season which helped him to a sixteenth-place finish.

FIA Formula 2 Championship

2020 
His teammate was also announced on the same day to be the Brit Jack Aitken. Throughout the year the Brazilian did not score any points, with a 14th-place finish at Monza being his best result of the year. Samaia finished 24th in the drivers' standings, the lowest of the drivers who competed full-time.

2021 

Despite his performance, he made an appearance for Charouz Racing System at the post-season test in Bahrain and was soon confirmed to be partnering David Beckmann at the Czech team for the 2021 season. Samaia's results did not improve, failing to score points for a second year in a row; his best results for the year was a pair of 11th-places in Bahrain. He finished 24th in the drivers' standings for a second year in a row. Samaia left the team and the series at the end of the season.

Retirement 
On February 23, 2022, Samaia announced that he was retiring from motorsport. He left open the possibility of returning in the future.

Karting record

Karting career summary

Racing record

Racing career summary 

† As Samaia was a guest driver, he was ineligible to score points.
* Season still in progress.

Complete Euroformula Open Championship results 
(key) (Races in bold indicate pole position; races in italics indicate points for the fastest lap of top ten finishers)

Complete FIA Formula 2 Championship results
(key) (Races in bold indicate pole position) (Races in italics indicate points for the fastest lap of top ten finishers)

† Driver did not finish the race, but was classified, as they completed more than 90% of the race distance.

References

External links
 

1996 births
Living people
Racing drivers from São Paulo
Brazilian Formula Three Championship drivers
BRDC British Formula 3 Championship drivers
FIA Formula 2 Championship drivers
Euroformula Open Championship drivers
Double R Racing drivers
Carlin racing drivers
RP Motorsport drivers
Teo Martín Motorsport drivers
Campos Racing drivers
Charouz Racing System drivers